Mortimer Jordan High School is a public high school located in Kimberly, Alabama. It is a part of the Jefferson County Board of Education.

The school was named after Captain Mortimer Harvie Jordan, a war hero who lost his life in World War I. He was a soldier, officer and physician. As commanding officer of Company K, 167th infantry, 42nd "Rainbow Division" Alabama Army National Guard, he was mortally wounded while leading his sector in battle. He died of his wounds in 1918 and is buried in Arlington National Cemetery.

Student profile 
Enrollment in grades 9-12 for the 2012-13 school year is 757 students. Approximately 98% of students are White, 1% are African-American, and 1% are other races/ethnicities. Roughly 29% of students qualify for free or reduced price lunch.

MJHS has a graduation rate of 95%. Approximately 87% of its students meet or exceed proficiency standards in mathematics, while 92% meet or exceed standards in reading. The average ACT score for MJHS students is 24 and the average SAT composite is 1640.

Foundation
Mortimer Jordan High School opened its doors in the fall of 1920 at its original campus in Morris, Alabama with a mere ninety students enrolled. Two students, Ms. Sudie Counts Rogers and Ms. Eileen Jenkins Lovelady, graduated that year. The first principal, Ms. Minnie Holliman, and three female teachers completed the faculty. In 1928, a student, Ms. Mabel Creel graduated valedictorian at the age of 13. She was the youngest to graduate with such high honors.

Craig Kanaday is the seventh and current principal of MJHS.

Improvements
The original facility was located in Morris, with the property directly adjacent to the city limits of Kimberly. This site was occupied until the end of the 2010-11 school year.

The original building of five rooms soon became inadequate and a frame building of eight rooms was added. The first water system for the school was installed during the early 1930s. Alabama By-Product Corporation in Majestic donated the pump and water filter to the school using Turkey Creek as the water source. A teacher and some students installed the system, and water fountains were placed outside the building. Between the years of 1937 and 1941 indoor plumbing and restrooms were installed.

The "old gym" was built by the WPA during 1936 and 1937, around the same time the lunchroom program was established. The first Miss Mortimer Jordan, now Miss Torch, was elected in 1937. Stage curtains were purchased for the gym stage with the proceeds from the pageant.

During the early 1950s, a then up-to-date football and athletic field was constructed. Restrooms in the football stadium were added in 1962.

During the 1960s, Gardendale High School was established south of Morris in Gardendale.  Until that time, students in the Gardendale area attended Mortimer Jordan High School.  Gardendale based students were phased out in the mid-to-late 1960s.  MJ senior high school students from Gardendale were allowed to finish senior high school at Mortimer Jordan if they desired or could transfer to Gardendale.  Many chose to finish at MJ.  Buses to MJ ran routes through Gardendale for several years concurrent with buses to Gardendale until the phase out was completed in 1968-69.

In its last incarnation at the Morris site, the school consisted of a multi-complex that included two gymnasiums, academic classrooms, and a lunchroom. A music department (band and choir), homemaking department, business education department, and student counseling service were added.

A brand new Mortimer Jordan High School was built on Bone Dry Road, approximately four miles from the old site. It opened in the fall of 2011. The new site, one of a series of new high schools built during the period by the Jefferson County Schools, consists of classroom buildings, an athletics field house, and two fields for football, baseball and softball. A competition and a practice gymnasium, as well as greatly enlarged practice facilities for wrestling, are also included.

The original site in Morris was converted into the William E. Burkett Center for handicapped students; the W.E.B.C. moved from its original location near Fultondale to the original MJHS campus at the beginning of the 2012-13 school year.

Sports
The athletic department fields teams in football, volleyball, cross country, basketball, wrestling, baseball, softball, golf, soccer, tennis, and track and field. The softball team won the Alabama High School Athletic Association Class 5A State Championship in 2008 and 2009, setting a state record in 2009 for most consecutive games won. That streak carried over into the 2010 season, and ended at 59 games when Jordan lost to Angelo Rodriguez High School of Fairfield, California in the ESPN RISE/Nike Fastest to First Tournament in Huntington Beach, California on March 25, 2010. (The team later finished second in the 2010 5A championship, upset by Athens High twice on the final day.) Jordan also won the 2011 championship, only the fourth team in state history to win a title after losing their opening game in the double-elimination tournament. The softball program won its first state championship with the 1999 4A-5A title. It also has five second-place finishes. Mortimer Jordan also has one basketball state championship from 1928. The football program was the 5A runner-up in 2015, playing in its first AHSAA Super 7 appearance at Bryant–Denny Stadium.

Mortimer Jordan High School is accredited by the Southern Association of Colleges and Schools and the Alabama Department of Education.

Notable alumni 
 Spencer Brown,  American football running back
 Pat Buttram, actor
 Devlin Hodges, professional quarterback
 Haylie McCleney, US softball Olympian
 Peter Tom Willis, professional football player

References

External links
  Mortimer Jordan High School Website

Educational institutions established in 1920
Public high schools in Alabama
Schools in Jefferson County, Alabama
School buildings completed in 2011
1920 establishments in Alabama